Mičevec is a village in Central Croatia, located north of Velika Gorica. The population is 1,286 (census 2011).

References

Populated places in Zagreb County